Penetang Midland Coach Lines Ltd. (PMCL) was a regional and charter bus operator in Ontario which was acquired by Greyhound Canada.

PMCL once operated inter-terminal bus service at Toronto Pearson International Airport and was a school bus operator in the Greater Toronto Area.  PMCL held intercity bus licensing to service the Penetanguishene, Midland and Barrie area to Toronto. It still maintains service at Yorkdale Bus Terminal operated by Greyhound Canada Transportation Corporation.  Laidlaw purchased PMCL from the Dubeau family in 1997, operating the school bus routes directly while moving intercity line-runs, inter-terminal and contract shuttles, Barrie and Orillia transit and tour operations under the control of Greyhound Travel Services.

Following Laidlaw Inc. restructuring in 2003, PMCL was formally merged with Greyhound Canada Transportation Corporation resulting in the closing of PMCL's head office in Etobicoke.

Greyhound still uses the Ontario registered company to operate many of their services in that province:
Cha-Co Trails charters and local bus services (originally under Chatham Coach Lines).
Gray Line Toronto and Gray Line Ottawa the local franchises of Gray Line Worldwide operating open top double decker bus tours, tour trams and coach tours.

See also

 Greyhound Canada
 Gray Coach

External links
 PMCL history
 PMCL fleet

Bus transport in Simcoe County
Defunct intercity bus companies of Canada
Penetanguishene
Bus transport in Ontario